Henn Põlluaas (born 16 February 1960) is an Estonian politician and the President of the Riigikogu since April 2019 to March 2021. He was also the mayor of Saue from 2012 until 2015 when he was elected to the parliament. He has been the vice-chairman of the Conservative People's Party since 2017. In June 2021, Põlluaas was announced as the Conservative People's Party candidate in the 2021 Estonian presidential election.

When he was elected the President of the Riigikogu, he immediately ordered two European Union flags in the main reception hall of the parliament to be removed. After he lost the position in March 2021, the EU flags were restored.

References

1960 births
Conservative People's Party of Estonia politicians
Leaders of political parties in Estonia
Living people
Mayors of places in Estonia
Members of the Riigikogu, 2015–2019
Members of the Riigikogu, 2019–2023
Members of the Riigikogu, 2023–2027
Politicians from Tallinn
Speakers of the Riigikogu
Tallinn University alumni